4310 may refer to:
a year in the 5th millennium
4310th Air Division
4310 Strömholm, an asteroid
KAMAZ 4310 6x6 Chassis truck